Michael H. McDermott (1864–1947) was a pitcher in Major League Baseball who played for the Louisville Colonels of the American Association during the 1889 season. Besides, he spent parts of six seasons in the minor leagues between 1885 and 1892, primarily in the New England League.

External links

1864 births
1947 deaths
Major League Baseball pitchers
Baseball players from Massachusetts
19th-century baseball players
Louisville Colonels players
Newburyport Clamdiggers players
Manchester Farmers players
Portsmouth Lillies players
Manchester Maroons players
Auburn Yankees players
Jersey City Jerseys players
Manchester Gazettes players
Reading Actives players
Fall River Indians players
New Bedford Whalers (baseball) players
New Bedford Browns players
Cobleskill Giants players